Wesley Edward Sims (born 12 October 1979) is a retired American professional mixed martial artist. A professional from 2001 until 2013, he competed in the UFC, the WEC, Strikeforce, K-1 and the IFL.

Background 
Sims was born in Cleveland and raised in Amanda, Ohio. He was a star center on the basketball team at Amanda-Clearcreek High School, and went on to Mount St. Joseph University in Cincinnati. However, he dropped out after only one semester to pursue a career in professional wrestling, moving back to Columbus to train. He soon met legendary UFC and PRIDE FC fighter Mark Coleman who had a better plan for the young Sims which was to become a mixed martial artist, believing that Sim's huge size advantage would be significant against opponents. Sims helped Coleman prepare for his bout with Ricardo Morais at PRIDE 8, before embarking on his own career in the sport.

Mixed martial arts career

Frank Mir rivalry 
In 2003, Sims fought a controversial fight against Frank Mir at UFC 43. At the very beginning of the fight, Mir put out his hand to touch gloves and Sims rushed past Mir's outstretched hand and into a quickly maneuvered takedown by Mir. In the first round, after slamming Mir to prevent an armbar, Sims got up while Mir was on his back against the fence and proceeded to stomp Mir's face several times while holding the fence for extra balance. The fight was stopped and Sims was disqualified.

This started a rivalry between the two and they met again in 2004 at UFC 46. Mir easily took control of the first round with an arm triangle attempt. Near the end of the second round Mir hit Sims with knee strikes to the face and then punches to knock Sims out.

Mike Kyle bite incident 
Sims fought again in the UFC at the UFC 47 against Mike Kyle. Sims took the fight on less than a weeks notice after Kyle's original opponent got injured. Kyle dominated the entire first round and knocked Sims out at 4:59. Sims protested after the fight that Kyle had bitten him on the chest. During the post fight interview, a bite mark could clearly be seen on Sims' left pectoral muscle. This marks the first time a bite has ever happened in a UFC fight since its UFC 1 in 1993, when Gerard Gordeau bit Royce Gracie in the championship match. When asked in the cage after the fight to explain the bite, Kyle told commentator Joe Rogan "he's a dirty bastard anyways, look at all the stuff he's done..." Kyle denied any wrongdoing.

After losing to Kyle he was released by the UFC.

Tim Sylvia rivalry 
Wes Sims faced former UFC heavyweight champion Tim Sylvia at SuperBrawl 38. Sylvia was coming off a title loss against Frank Mir, a fight in which he broke his right arm and needed a titanium plate inserted. The two did not touch gloves and Wes began the fight by sprinting towards Sylvia and then backing away. Sylvia got a takedown early and passed through to mount almost right away, but accidentally mounted his knee on top of Sims' shoulder, seriously injuring it. Wes was unable to defend himself with the injury and Sylvia won by strikes in the first round. Tim and Wes had a heated exchange after the fight when Sylvia called Sims out and said he did not deserve to stand in front of him. Wes ran up to Sylvia and trainers had to separate the two. Wes and Tim were supposed to have their rematch for the International Fighting Championships (IFC) Heavyweight title June 6 but Sylvia was injured and the fight was cancelled.

The Ultimate Fighter 
Sims returned to the UFC as a cast member on the tenth season of The Ultimate Fighter, which began filming in June 2009. Sims was defeated by castmate Justin Wren via arm triangle in the first round of Sims' first fight in the house. Despite his early exit from the competition, Sims was seen regularly on the show and may have earned a reputation for being one of the bullies of the household due to his constant childlike tauntings of Matt Mitrione and Zak Jensen.

Strikeforce 
Sims made his Strikeforce debut against Bobby Lashley on January 30, 2010 at Strikeforce: Miami. Sims came up short and was defeated by Bobby Lashley by TKO. Sims was taken down at the beginning of the first round by the decorated wrestler, who then used the ground and pound technique on the 6'8 UFC veteran. The referee stopped to the fight much to the dismay of Sims, who believed that the stoppage was premature. Sims was expected to fight former UFC Heavyweight Champion Tim Sylvia in Ohio outside of Strikeforce but the Ohio State Athletic Commission did not sanction the bout, citing that the fight was "non-competitive".

Charitable acts 
Sims has been friends, since before UFC 47, and former training partners with former UFC Hall of Famer Mark Coleman and the deceased Kevin Randleman; they were all very close and described by MMA Weekly in an interview with Randleman, with Sims present, as the 3 Amigos. When Coleman was suffering from issues related to hip replacement injuries and training fighters on the Ultimate Fighter (he was the wrestling coach on BJ Penn's team on The Ultimate Fighter: Team Edgar vs. Team Penn), Sims set up a GoFundMe page for Coleman without his knowledge to help pay him for his medical expenses. Thanks to Sims, donations raised over $51,000, including a $5,000 donations from fellow Pride FC and UFC fighter Mark Hunt, for Coleman's medical expenses, halfway meeting the goal of $100,000.

Mixed martial arts record 

|-
| Loss
| align=center|  (2)
| George Oiler
| Submission (armbar)
| Dugout Summer Throwdown
| 
| align=center| 1
| align=center| 2:15
| Parkersburg, West Virginia, United States
|
|-
| Win
| align=center| 24–14–1 (2)
| Ruben Villareal
| Submission (guillotine choke)
| Gladiator Challenge: Hammer Time
| 
| align=center| 1
| align=center| 0:37
| Lincoln, California, United States
| 
|-
| Loss
| align=center| 23–14–1 (2)
| Lyubomir Simeonov
| Submission (heel hook)
| Maxfight 27
| 
| align=center| 2
| align=center| 1:05
| Sofia, Bulgaria
| 
|-
| Loss
| align=center| 23–13–1 (2)
| Bobby Lashley
| TKO (punches)
| Strikeforce: Miami
| 
| align=center| 1
| align=center| 2:06
| Sunrise, Florida, United States
| 
|-
| Win
| align=center| 23–12–1 (2)
| Jason DeAngelo
| KO (punches)
| FCFS 29: Battlefield 2
| 
| align=center| 1
| align=center| 0:18
| Fort Wayne, Indiana, United States
| 
|-
| Win
| align=center| 22–12–1 (2)
| Clifford Coon
| Submission (kneebar)
| FCFS 26: Beach-N-Brawl
| 
| align=center| 1
| align=center| 1:32
| Fort Wayne, Indiana, United States
| 
|-
| Win
| align=center| 21–12–1 (2)
| William Clifford
| Submission (guillotine choke)
| FCFS 26: Beach-N-Brawl
| 
| align=center| 1
| align=center| 2:12
| Fort Wayne, Indiana, United States
| 
|-
| Loss
| align=center| 20–12–1 (2)
| Steve Bossé
| Submission (toe hold)
| TKO 34: Sims VS Bosse
| 
| align=center| 1
| align=center| 3:05
| Montreal, Quebec, Canada
| 
|-
| Loss
| align=center| 20–11–1 (2)
| Travis Fulton
| Decision (unanimous)
| FF: Capitol Punishment
| 
| align=center| 3
| align=center| 5:00
| Columbus, Ohio, United States
| 
|-
| Loss
| align=center| 20–10–1 (2)
| Chris Guillen
| TKO (corner stoppage)
| IFO: Fireworks in the Cage
| 
| align=center| 2
| align=center| 5:00
| Las Vegas, Nevada, United States
| 
|-
| Win
| align=center| 20–9–1 (2)
| Daniel Long
| TKO (punches)
| FCFS 12: Bloodsport
| 
| align=center| 1
| align=center| 4:01
| Fort Wayne, Indiana, United States
| 
|-
| Loss
| align=center| 19–9–1 (2)
| Chris Guillen
| Decision (unanimous)
| UAFC: Art of War 2
| 
| align=center| 3
| align=center| 5:00
| Dallas, Texas, United States
| 
|-
| NC
| align=center| 19–8–1 (2)
| Van Palacio
| NC
| PFC 2: Fast and Furious
| 
| align=center| 1
| align=center| 0:54
| Lemoore, California, United States
| 
|-
| Win
| align=center| 19–8–1 (1)
| William Jaggers
| TKO (submission to punches)
| FCFS 7: Fight Club
| 
| align=center| 1
| align=center| 0:28
| Fort Wayne, Indiana, United States
| 
|-
| Win
| align=center| 18–8–1 (1)
| Albert Palmer
| TKO (submission to punches)
| FOG: Fists of Furry
| 
| align=center| 1
| align=center| 0:54
| Richmond, Indiana, United States
| 
|-
| Win
| align=center| 17–8–1 (1)
| Anton Cano
| DQ (groin kick)
| MMA: Mexico
| 
| align=center| 2
| align=center| 0:08
| Monterrey, Mexico
| 
|-
| Win
| align=center| 16–8–1 (1)
| Kimo Leopoldo
| TKO (referee stoppage)
| Extreme Wars 5: Battlegrounds
| 
| align=center| 1
| align=center| 1:13
| Honolulu, Hawaii, United States
| 
|-
| Win
| align=center| 15–8–1 (1)
| Robert Hogan
| KO (punches)
| FCFS 3: Full Contact Fight Series
| 
| align=center| 1
| align=center| 1:07
| Auburn, Indiana, United States
| 
|-
| Win
| align=center| 14–8–1 (1)
| Jabari Hawthorne
| KO (knees)
| HHCF 27: Rumble at the Rodeo 2
| 
| align=center| 1
| align=center| 0:36
| Chillicothe, Ohio, United States
| 
|-
| Win
| align=center| 13–8–1 (1)
| Joel Surprenant
| Submission (triangle choke)
| WEC 22: The Hitmen
| 
| align=center| 1
| align=center| 0:28
| Lemoore, California, United States
| 
|-
| Win
| align=center| 12–8–1 (1)
| Paul Bowers
| Submission
| UFS 2: Ultimate Fight Series 2
| 
| align=center| 1
| align=center| 0:39
| Auburn, Indiana, United States
| 
|-
| Loss
| align=center| 11–8–1 (1)
| Daniel Gracie
| Technical Submission (standing rear-naked choke)
| IFL: Championship 2006
| 
| align=center| 1
| align=center| 2:42
| Atlantic City, New Jersey, United States
| 
|-
| Win
| align=center| 11–7–1 (1)
| Buddy Butler
| TKO (submission to punches)
| UFS: Ultimate Fight Series
| 
| align=center| 1
| align=center| 0:50
| Auburn, Indiana, United States
| 
|-
| Draw
| align=center| 10–7–1 (1)
| Daniel Gracie
| Technical Draw
| GFC: Team Gracie vs Team Hammer House
| 
| align=center| 2
| align=center| 5:00
| Columbus, Ohio, United States
| 
|-
| Win
| align=center| 10–7 (1)
| Jyunpei Hamada
| Submission (triangle choke)
| RFN 2: Ryukyu Fight Night 2
| 
| align=center| 1
| align=center| 3:07
| Okinawa, Japan
| 
|-
| Win
| align=center| 9–7 (1)
| Dustin Sutton
| TKO (punches)
| HHCF 22: Rumble at the Rodeo
| 
| align=center| 1
| align=center| 0:36
| Chillicothe, Ohio, United States
| 
|-
| Win
| align=center| 8–7 (1)
| Shane Lightle
| KO (punch)
| HHCF 21: Redemption
| 
| align=center| 1
| align=center| 1:54
| Columbus, Ohio, United States
| 
|-
| Loss
| align=center| 7–7 (1)
| Tim Sylvia
| TKO (punches)
| SB 38: SuperBrawl 38
| 
| align=center| 1
| align=center| 1:32
| Honolulu, Hawaii, United States
| 
|-
| Loss
| align=center| 7–6 (1)
| Antoni Hardonk
| Submission (americana)
| K-1 Fighting Network Rumble on the Rock 2004
| 
| align=center| 1
| align=center| 4:24
| Honolulu, Hawaii, United States
| 
|-
| Win
| align=center| 7–5 (1)
| Joe Mellotte
| TKO (submission to punches)
| EFC 9: Extreme Fighting Challenge 9
| 
| align=center| 1
| align=center| 1:00
| Cleveland, Ohio, United States
| 
|-
| Loss
| align=center| 6–5 (1)
| Ricardeau Francois
| TKO (punches)
| APEX: Genesis
| 
| align=center| 2
| align=center| 0:26
| Montreal, Quebec, Canada
| 
|-
| Loss
| align=center| 6–4 (1)
| Mike Kyle
| KO (punch)
| UFC 47
| 
| align=center| 1
| align=center| 4:59
| Las Vegas, Nevada, United States
| 
|-
| Loss
| align=center| 6–3 (1)
| Frank Mir
| KO (knee and punches)
| UFC 46
| 
| align=center| 2
| align=center| 4:21
| Las Vegas, Nevada, United States
| 
|-
| Loss
| align=center| 6–2 (1)
| Frank Mir
| DQ (illegal stomping)
| UFC 43
| 
| align=center| 1
| align=center| 2:55
| Las Vegas, Nevada, United States
| 
|-
| Win
| align=center| 6–1 (1)
| Conan Silveira
| TKO (punches)
| HOOKnSHOOT: Absolute Fighting Championships 1
| 
| align=center| 2
| align=center| 2:13
| Fort Lauderdale, Florida, United States
| 
|-
| NC
| align=center| 5–1 (1)
| Edwin Allseitz
| NC
| HHCF 3: Unfinished Fury
| 
| align=center| N/A
| align=center| N/A
| Lancaster, Ohio, United States
| 
|-
| Win
| align=center| 5–1
| Mike Shepard
| Submission (guillotine choke)
| WEF 12: World Extreme Fighting 12
| 
| align=center| 1
| align=center| 3:00
| Steubenville, Ohio, United States
| 
|-
| Win
| align=center| 4–1
| John Harmon
| Submission (triangle choke)
| HHCF 1: Backyard Brawl
| 
| align=center| 1
| align=center| N/A
| Lancaster, Ohio, United States
| 
|-
| Win
| align=center| 3–1
| Joe Mellotte
| Submission (triangle choke)
| OCF: Ohio Cage Fights
| 
| align=center| N/A
| align=center| N/A
| Delaware, Ohio, United States
| 
|-
| Win
| align=center| 2–1
| Josh Mueller
| N/A
| UW: St. Cloud 1
| 
| align=center| 1
| align=center| 1:18
| St. Cloud, Minnesota, United States
| 
|-
| Win
| align=center| 1–1
| Mike Paduano
| TKO (forfeit)
| RSF 7: Animal Instinct
| 
| align=center| 1
| align=center| 0:01
| Lakeland, Florida, United States
| 
|-
| Loss
| align=center| 0–1
| Dan Severn
| Decision
| RSF 2: Attack at the Track
| 
| align=center| 3
| align=center| 4:00
| Chester, West Virginia, United States
|

Mixed martial arts exhibition record 

|-
| Lose
| align=center| 0–1
| Justin Wren
| Technical Submission (arm-triangle choke)
| The Ultimate Fighter: Heavyweights
| N/A
| align=center| 1
| align=center| N/A
| Las Vegas, Nevada
|

See also 
 List of male mixed martial artists

References

External links
 
 

1979 births
Living people
American male mixed martial artists
People from Fairfield County, Ohio
Sportspeople from Cleveland
People from Lancaster, Ohio
Heavyweight mixed martial artists
Mixed martial artists utilizing wrestling
Ultimate Fighting Championship male fighters